Petra Kvitová was the defending champion, but chose not to participate.

Elise Mertens won the title, defeating Simona Halep in the final, 3–6, 6–4, 6–3.

Seeds
The top four seeds received a bye into the second round.

Draw

Finals

Top half

Bottom half

Qualifying

Seeds
The top seed received a bye into the second round.

Qualifiers

Lucky losers

Draw

First qualifier

Second qualifier

Third qualifier

Fourth qualifier

References
Main Draw
Qualifying Draw

2019 WTA Tour
2019
2019 in Qatari sport